"Them" is the tenth episode of the fifth season of the post-apocalyptic horror television series The Walking Dead, which aired on AMC on February 15, 2015. The episode was written by Heather Bellson and directed by Julius Ramsay. In the episode, the group of Rick Grimes (Andrew Lincoln) are exhausted and dehydrated from their journey to Washington, D.C., while several members of the group continue to grieve over the group's recent losses and question their chances of survival.

The episode primarily centers on the characters of Maggie, Sasha, and Daryl dealing with the losses of Beth and Tyreese. It also focuses on Glenn's sinking depression and giving up hope, while Abraham becomes intensely reclusive and Michonne's struggles to keep holding onto hope. It also features the introduction of Ross Marquand as Aaron, a prominent character from the graphic novel the television series is based on.

Plot
The group continues to reel from the deaths of Beth and Tyreese, with Maggie, Sasha, and Daryl taking the losses the hardest. 60 miles away from Washington, D.C., the survivors' van runs out of gas, forcing them to travel on foot. With almost no water or food, they question their chances of survival. Gabriel attempts to console Maggie, but she chastises him for abandoning his flock when the outbreak occurred. Carl gifts Maggie a broken music box, but she remains detached.

Rick orchestrates a plan to eliminate the pursuing herd of walkers, which will require minimal exertion from the exhausted group. However, Sasha breaks from the working plan with recklessness that puts others in danger, and Abraham is wounded when Sasha cuts him haphazardly while swinging at walkers. Sasha is angrily rebuked by Michonne, who warns her not to end up like Sasha's brother, Tyreese.

The group find several abandoned cars. In one of the trunks, Maggie finds a tied up female walker. Glenn kills it for her, and later urges her to keep fighting to live. He also tells Daryl that they will survive, but only together.

A pack of feral dogs, one a Doberman still wearing a collar, appear and begin to bark at the group. Before the others react, Sasha dispatches the dogs with a silenced weapon, which unsettles the others. Rick begins to prepare a fire. The group cook and eat the dog meat, but Noah instead stares at the discarded dog collar. Gabriel throws his priest collar into the fire, signifying his lost faith.

Despite comfort from Carol, a grieving Daryl begins to self-harm and when alone breaks down in tears. Dehydrated, the survivors find jugs and ten bottles of water waiting for them in the middle of the road with a note reading, "from a friend". Eugene volunteers to drink the water himself to see if it is a trap but Abraham knocks the bottle out of his hand.

Suddenly, rain begins to fall, causing the group to rejoice, but Maggie, Sasha, and Daryl remain somber. The rain worsens to a thunderstorm, so the group take shelter in a nearby barn. Maggie finds and kills the previous inhabitant, now a walker, and observes "she could have killed herself." Carol replies that "some people can't give up, like us."

Later, Rick muses that this life may be easier for children, since growing up is getting used to the world. Michonne insists that this is not the world, and accepting it is giving up. Rick relates a story of his grandfather, who fought in World War II and survived by convincing himself that he was already a dead man. Rick says that like his grandfather, they have to "do what we need to do" in this reality until the situation changes and they are able to live, and tell themselves they "are the walking dead." Daryl rejects this notion, insisting that they aren't "them". A herd of walkers approaches the barn; Daryl, Maggie, and Sasha, who are not sleeping, work together to barricade the door, and are joined by the rest of the group.

The next morning, the storm itself has destroyed the walkers. Daryl tells Maggie he has fixed the music box. Maggie takes Sasha to watch the sunrise. Sasha confides that she doesn't know how to carry on, but Maggie says they will. The two find the music box still broken, but are suddenly approached by a man named Aaron (Ross Marquand), who identifies himself as a "friend" and asks for Rick by name. They point their guns at him suspiciously. Suddenly, the music box begins playing.

Reception

Viewership

Upon airing, the episode was watched by 12.27 million American viewers with an 18-49 rating of 6.2, a decrease in viewership from the previous episode which had 15.64 million viewers and an 18-49 rating of 8.0.

In Australia, the episode was watched by 70,000 viewers, making it the second most-watched broadcast on pay television that day. The UK broadcast was the third most-watched on the network that month, with 893,000 viewers.

Critical reception
The episode received generally positive reviews, with many praising aspects such as the theme of grief, the introduction of Aaron at the end and the sequences involving the barn and Sasha fuelling her rage on the zombies. Laura Prudom for Variety commented positively on the episode calling it "contemplative but emotionally satisfying." On his review for the episode, Ron Hogan for Den of Geek commented positively on the episode's themes and felt that Sonequa Martin-Green delivered the best performance of the episode.

Rebecca Hawkes of The Daily Telegraph gave the episode 4 stars calling it "mystical". She felt that the episode "raised interesting questions about whether a life based on survival is little better than being dead", referring to the scene where Rick refers to the survivors as "the walking dead", referencing the title of the series. She further assessed that "while Gabriel may have rejected religion, it was in fact an episode filled with oddly religious, hope-inspiring moments, including the fortuitous arrival of a rain storm just when the group were struggling with their thirst. A sequence in which Daryl, Maggie and Sasha held a barn door close against an onslaught of walkers had a dreamlike, mystical quality." She praised the ending scene, calling it "refreshing" that the series "is returning to a more plot-driven formula."

Matt Fowler of IGN reacted positively to Rick's speech, the scene involving Sasha taking out her rage on the zombies and the introduction of Aaron from the comic book series. Although, he felt the episode covered old ground. Overall, he gave the episode a 7.6 out of 10. USA Today also enjoyed the scene involving Sasha, and called Aaron's scene an "exciting new development".

References

External links

"Them" at AMC

2015 American television episodes
The Walking Dead (season 5) episodes